Two ships of the Japanese Navy have been named Hachijo or Hachijyo:

 , a  launched in 1940 and scrapped in 1948
 , a  launched in 1991 and struck in 2017

Japanese Navy ship names